Pervomayka is the name of several rural localities in Russia.

Modern localities

Chelyabinsk Oblast
As of 2014, three rural localities in Chelyabinsk Oblast bear this name:

Pervomayka, Kartalinsky District, Chelyabinsk Oblast, a settlement in Poltavsky Selsoviet of Kartalinsky District; 
Pervomayka, Kizilsky District, Chelyabinsk Oblast, a settlement in Granitny Selsoviet of Kizilsky District; 
Pervomayka, Troitsky District, Chelyabinsk Oblast, a settlement in Drobyshevsky Selsoviet of Troitsky District;

Kostroma Oblast
As of 2014, one rural locality in Kostroma Oblast bears this name:

Pervomayka, Kostroma Oblast, a settlement in Gorchukhinskoye Settlement of Makaryevsky District;

Kurgan Oblast
As of 2014, one rural locality in Kurgan Oblast bears this name:

Pervomayka, Kurgan Oblast, a village in Kislyansky Selsoviet of Tselinny District;

Moscow Oblast
As of 2014, one rural locality in Moscow Oblast bears this name:

Pervomayka, Moscow Oblast, a village in Zabolotyevskoye Rural Settlement of Ramensky District;

Perm Krai
As of 2014, one rural locality in Perm Krai bears this name:
Pervomayka, Perm Krai, a village in Vereshchaginsky District

Abolished localities
Pervomayka, Tomsk Oblast, a village in Kolpashevsky District of Tomsk Oblast; abolished in December 2014

Alternative names
Pervomayka, alternative name of Pervomayevka, a selo in Pervomayevsky Selsoviet of Zaigrayevsky District in the Republic of Buryatia; 
Pervomayka, alternative name of Pervomayskaya, a village in Oktyabrsky Selsoviet of Petukhovsky District in Kurgan Oblast; 
Pervomayka, alternative name of Vishnevka, a village in Zauralsky Selsoviet of Kargapolsky District in Kurgan Oblast;